Gopurajapuram is a village in the Papanasam taluk of Thanjavur district, Tamil Nadu, India.

Demographics 

As per the 2001 census, Gopurajapuram had a total population of 2125 with 1057 males and 1068 females. The sex ratio was 1010. The literacy rate was 73.34.

References 

 

Villages in Thanjavur district